Dorcatoma chrysomelina is a species of beetle in the family Ptinidae. It is associated with the fungus known as crab-of-the-woods (Laetiporus sulphureus).

References

Ptinidae
Beetles described in 1837